Nadina Abarth-Žerjav (née Nadja Žerjav) (March 5, 1912, Gorizia – September 16, 2000, Ljubljana) was the daughter of the Slovene politician and lawyer minister Gregor Žerjav and his wife, Milena née Lavrenčič. 
Her younger brother was Borut Žerjav (1916–1977), a journalist in Paris after the Second World War. Her twin sister was Tatjana, who died young from tuberculosis (in 1943).

Žerjav spent her early childhood in Graz and Ljubljana. Because her father, a politician, was preventively arrested and imprisoned during World War I in Ljubljana Castle and in Graz by the Austro-Hungarian authorities for his "notorious pro-Serbian attitudes", she lived for some time with her grandparents. After the early death of both her parents from tuberculosis, she was educated in Munich and Paris. Later she lived in Ljubljana. One of her close friends there was the painter Zoran Mušič. She was wounded during the war, during the murder of Avgust Praprotnik in Ljubljana on February 20, 1942.

On November 28, 1949, Žerjav was married to Carlo Abarth, the well-known Turin automobile industrialist. Abarth-Žerjav and Carlo Abarth met in 1944 at Lake Garda (Italy). They may have even met during the war in Ljubljana, as Abarth lived there. Abarth-Zerjav supported her husband during the founding period of the Abarth works, and also in every possible way later on. She initiated contact with Tazio Nuvolari, which became important during the first years of the existence of the Squadra Abarth. She spoke seven languages, which enabled her to engage in public relations in foreign countries as well. 
Even after their divorce in 1979, she remained on friendly terms with Carlo Abarth, and after his death she continued to admire him greatly. The couple had no children.

After the breakup of Yugoslavia in 1991, Abarth-Zerjav, who had Italian citizenship since 1949, applied for Slovenian citizenship and finally received it in 1997 in honour of her family's history.

Abarth-Zerjav lived in Turin for over 50 years and was well known there. She left Turin in November 1999 because of ill health and moved in with her nephew’s family in Ljubljana where she died on September 16, 2000. She was buried five days later at her family's gravesite, a protected monument in Žale Cemetery in Ljubljana.

References

Press release after death of Nadina Abarth-Zerjav

Notice of death La Stampa 19.9.2000

Correspondence with Tazio Nuvolari - left letters, Nuvolari-Guerra Museum, Centro Guide Mantova "I Gonzaga"

notice of death Carlo Abarth, Stampasera, 26.10.1979

Interviews with Nadina Abarth-Zerjav (Dario Lampa)

Gianfranco Fagiuoli - Guido Gerosa: Carlo Abarth, Automobile Club d'Italia, l'editrice dell automobile

Gianfranco Fagiuoli - Guido Gerosa: Carlo Abarth, Motorbuch Verlag

Carlo Abarth, l'uomo, le macchine

Carli Abarth, the man, the machines

period-foto-documents released by Abarth & Co, Turin, Italy

External links 
 Nadina Abarth-Zerjav – Notice of Death at NonSoloMacchine
 

1912 births
2000 deaths
20th-century Italian businesswomen
20th-century Italian businesspeople
Businesspeople from Turin
People from Graz
Yugoslav emigrants to Italy